Chen Chao-an (born 22 June 1995) is a Taiwanese footballer who currently plays as a striker for Taichung FUTURO and the Chinese Taipei national football team.

International career

International goals
Scores and results list Chinese Taipei's goal tally first.

References

1995 births
Living people
Taiwanese footballers
Chinese Taipei international footballers
Hunan Billows players
Taiwanese expatriate sportspeople in China
Expatriate footballers in China
Taiwanese expatriate footballers
Association football forwards
Footballers at the 2018 Asian Games
Asian Games competitors for Chinese Taipei
People from Miaoli County